County routes in Cortland County, New York, are not signed with route markers; however, numbers are occasionally posted on street blade signs.

Routes 100–149

Routes 150 and up

See also

County routes in New York

References

External links
Empire State Roads – Cortland County Roads